Sound Credit is a music credits platform with computer software applications for Windows, macOS, iOS, and Android.  It includes the Sound Credit Publisher cross-platform desktop application, the Tracker cross-platform digital audio workstation (DAW) plug-in, physical kiosks, smart card check-in system, and online database.

Sound Credit is used in the music industry through multimodal interaction, with a free user profile option including identifier code generation, data entry and editing software developed for information quality (IQ).  It also functions as a data hub and exporter for data transmission throughout the music industry supply chain for royalty payment and attribution purposes.

Music credits are loaded and saved into Sound Credit's DDEX RIN format implementation, as the first software available to the public with this capability.  As of 2019, Sound Credit is included with Pro Tools subscriptions.

History

Sound Credit was originally released under the brand Soundways RIN-M.  Soundways later renamed as Soundways dba Sound Credit.  RIN-M was renamed as the Sound Credit Tracker plug-in during the platform expansion.

In 2019, Sound Credit partnered with Phonographic Performance Limited (PPL), a British music copyright collective, for an International Performer Number (IPN) integration as part of its cloud profile services.

Sound Credit also partnered with Avid Technologies, the makers of Pro Tools, and the Sound Credit platform applications are included with Pro Tools subscriptions.

In July 2020, Sound Credit partnered to become an ISO International Standard Name Identifier (ISNI) Registration Agency, and released the first fully automated ISNI Registration feature as part of its cloud profile services.

Sound Credit was noted as being used in the delivery of credits and information on Blake Shelton's release God's Country to Warner Music.  The release received a GRAMMY Award nomination in 2020 and won Single of the Year for the 2019 Country Music Association (CMA) Awards.

Features and usage

Sound Credit Publisher
The Sound Credit Publisher is cross-platform software for Windows and macOS, allowing users to enter, edit, and export music credits.  This software is the primary application of the platform.  The Sound Credit Publisher runs natively on desktop computers and powers Sound Credit interactive kiosk hardware installations.

Primary features
 Single-window user interface with nested menus, fully scalable
 Native DDEX RIN loading and saving
 Grouped RIN loading and speed-optimized file switching
 Use of single RIN as a template for the creation of additional RINs
 International Standard Recording Code Generator
 Global Release Identifier Code Generator
 Incremental search
 Multimodal search
 Draft label copy export
 CD panel and vinyl sleeve exports
 Mastering workstation export (Magix Samplitude/Sequoia and Steinberg WaveLab)

Sound Credit Tracker Plug-in
The Sound Credit Tracker is a plug-in that works with digital audio workstation (DAW) software, including Garage Band, Logic, Nuendo, Sequoia, Wavelab, Cubase and Pro Tools.
 VST, AU and AAX plug-in format support
 BWAV embedding of Artist Name, Song Name and ISRC Codes

Sound Credit Kiosk
The Sound Credit kiosk is a standalone system for checking-in to music recording sessions.
 Magnetic stripe card support
 Barcode reader support

Sound Credit Mobile App
The Sound Credit mobile app allows profile management and session check-in.
 Android
 iOS

Investment Backing

Sound Credit is a C Corporation based in the United States.  It is one of approximately 100 companies backed by the Revolution Fund, led by Steve Case and which lists LPs including Jeff Bezos, Michael Bloomberg, Meg Whitman and others. Sound Credit is also backed by investment from US-based venture capital firm, Innova Capital.  Sound Credit was founded and engaged in Techstars Global Accelerator Network accelerator program, StartCo.

Sound Credit CEO and Co-founder, Gebre Waddell, appeared in 2019 on 60 Minutes in an episode about the Revolution Fund's investment in Sound Credit.

Reception

Sound Credit won the Rise of the Rest venture capital investment competition in 2018.

In 2019, Sound Credit was voted as a NAMM Show TEC Awards nominee.  Sound Credit was the first music credits software to be nominated for a TEC award.

Sound Credit appeared at the 2019 Creator Credits Summit in Stockholm hosted by Spotify, and the 2020 Creator Credits Summit.

Sound Credit was also featured at Recording Academy/GRAMMY Membership Celebrations in Portland, Oregon, and Houston, Texas.

References

External links
 Sound Credit Website

Cross-platform software
IOS software
Windows software
MacOS software
Android (operating system) software
Music software
Music production software
Companies based in Memphis, Tennessee
Music industry
American music industry
Music production
Black-owned companies of the United States
Music databases
Online music and lyrics databases
Online music database clients
Entertainment databases
Companies based in Tennessee
Technology companies of the United States
Technology companies established in 2016
Music technology
American companies established in 2016